Daloa Department is a department of Haut-Sassandra Region in Sassandra-Marahoué District, Ivory Coast. In 2021, its population was 705,378 and its seat is the settlement of Daloa. The sub-prefectures of the department are Bédiala, Daloa, Gadouan, Gboguhé, Gonaté, and Zaïbo.

History
Daloa Department was created in 1969 as one of the 24 new departments that were created to take the place of the six departments that were being abolished. It was created from territory that was formerly part of Centre-Ouest Department. Using current boundaries as a reference, from 1969 to 1980 the department occupied the same territory as Haut-Sassandra Region.

In 1980, Daloa Department was divided to create Issia Department. What remained was divided again in 1988 to create Vavoua Department.

In 1997, regions were introduced as new first-level subdivisions of Ivory Coast; as a result, all departments were converted into second-level subdivisions. Daloa Department was included as part of Haut-Sassandra Region.

A third division of Daloa Department occurred in 2008, with the creation of Zoukougbeu Department.

In 2011, districts were introduced as new first-level subdivisions of Ivory Coast. At the same time, regions were reorganised and became second-level subdivisions and all departments were converted into third-level subdivisions. At this time, Daloa Department was retained as part of Haut-Sassandra Region in the new Sassandra-Marahoué District.

Maps of historical boundaries

Notes

Departments of Haut-Sassandra
1969 establishments in Ivory Coast
States and territories established in 1969